ACF Fiorentina, commonly referred to as Fiorentina, is an Italian professional football club based in Florence, Tuscany, Italy. The original team was founded by a merger in August 1926, while the actual club was refounded in August 2002 following bankruptcy. Fiorentina have played at the top level of Italian football for the majority of their existence; only four clubs have played in more Serie A seasons.

Fiorentina has won two Italian league titles, in 1955–56 and again in 1968–69, as well as six Coppa Italia trophies and one Supercoppa Italiana. On the European stage, Fiorentina won the UEFA Cup Winners' Cup in 1960–61 and lost the final one year later. They finished runners-up in the 1956–57 European Cup, losing against Real Madrid, and also came close to winning the 1989–90 UEFA Cup, finishing as runners-up against Juventus after losing the first leg in Turin and drawing in the second one in Avellino.

Fiorentina is one of fifteen European teams that have played in the finals of all three major continental competitions: the Champions League (1956–1957, the first Italian team to reach the final in the top continental competition), the UEFA Cup Winners (1960–1961 and 1961–1962) and the UEFA Cup (1989–1990).

Since 1931, the club have played at the Stadio Artemio Franchi, which currently has a capacity of 43,147. The stadium has used several names over the years and has undergone several renovations. Fiorentina are known widely by the nickname Viola, a reference to their distinctive purple colours.

History

Foundation prior to World War II

Associazione Calcio Fiorentina was founded in the autumn of 1926 by local noble and National Fascist Party member Luigi Ridolfi, who initiated the merger of two older Florentine clubs, CS Firenze and PG Libertas. The aim of the merger was to give Florence a strong club to rival those of the more dominant Italian Football Championship sides of the time from Northwest Italy.

That same year saw the opening of the new stadium, originally named after Giovanni Berta, a prominent fascist, but now known as Stadio Artemio Franchi. At the time, the stadium was a masterpiece of engineering, and its inauguration was monumental. To be able to compete with the best teams in Italy, Fiorentina strengthened their team with some new players, notably the Uruguayan Pedro Petrone, nicknamed el Artillero. In 1941, they won their first Coppa Italia, but the team were unable to build on their success during the 1940s due to World War II and other troubles.

First scudetto and '50–'60s

In 1950, Fiorentina started to achieve consistent top-five finishes in the domestic league. The team consisted of players such as well-known goalkeeper Giuliano Sarti, Sergio Cervato, Francesco Rosella, Guido Gratton, Giuseppe Chiappella, Aldo Scaramucci, Brazilian Julinho, and Argentinian Miguel Montuori. This team won Fiorentina's first scudetto (Italian championship) in 1955–56, 12 points ahead of second-place Milan. Milan beat Fiorentina to top spot the following year. Fiorentina became the first Italian team to play in a European Cup final, when a disputed penalty led to a 2–0 defeat at the hands of Alfredo Di Stéfano's Real Madrid.
Fiorentina were runners-up again in the three subsequent seasons. In the 1960–61 season, the club won the Coppa Italia again and was also successful in Europe, winning the first Cup Winners' Cup against Scottish side Rangers.

After several years of runner-up finishes, Fiorentina dropped away slightly in the 1960s, bouncing from fourth to sixth place, although the club won the Coppa Italia and the Mitropa Cup in 1966.

Second scudetto and '70s
While the 1960s did result in some trophies and good Serie A finishes for Fiorentina, nobody believed that the club could challenge for the title. The 1968–69 season started with Milan as frontrunners, but on matchday 7, they lost to Bologna and were overtaken by Gigi Riva's Cagliari. Fiorentina, after an unimpressive start, then moved to the top of the Serie A, but the first half of their season finished with a 2–2 draw against Varese, leaving Cagliari as outright league leader. The second half of the season was a three-way battle between the three contending teams, Milan, Cagliari and Fiorentina. Milan fell away, instead focusing their efforts on the European Cup, and it seemed that Cagliari would retain top spot. After Cagliari lost against , however, Fiorentina took over at the top. The team then won all of their remaining matches, beating rivals Juve in Turin on the penultimate matchday to seal their second, and last, national title. In the European Cup competition the following year, Fiorentina had some good results, including a win in the Soviet Union against , but they were eventually knocked out in the quarter-finals after a 3–0 defeat in Glasgow to Celtic.

Viola players began the 1970s decade with Scudetto sewed on their breast, but the period was not especially fruitful for the team. After a fifth-place finish in 1971, they finished in mid-table almost every year, even flirting with relegation in 1972 and 1978. The Viola did win the Anglo-Italian League Cup in 1974 and won the Coppa Italia again in 1975. The team consisted of young talents like Vincenzo Guerini and Moreno Roggi, who suffered bad injuries, and above all Giancarlo Antognoni, who would later become an idol to Fiorentina's fans. The young average age of the players led to the team being called Fiorentina Ye-Ye.

Pontello era
In 1980, Fiorentina was bought by Flavio Pontello, who came from a rich house-building family. He quickly changed the team's anthem and logo, leading to some complaints by the fans, but he started to bring in high-quality players such as Francesco Graziani and Eraldo Pecci from Torino; Daniel Bertoni from Sevilla; Daniele Massaro from Monza; and a young Pietro Vierchowod from Como. The team was built around Giancarlo Antognoni, and in 1982, Fiorentina were involved in an exciting duel with rivals Juventus. After a bad injury to Antognoni, the league title was decided on the final day of the season when Fiorentina were denied a goal against Cagliari and were unable to win. Juventus won the title with a disputed penalty and the rivalry between the two teams erupted.

The following years were strange for Fiorentina, who vacillated between high finishes and relegation battles. Fiorentina also bought two interesting players, El Puntero Ramón Díaz and, most significantly, the young Roberto Baggio.

In 1990, Fiorentina fought to avoid relegation right up until the final day of the season, but did reach the UEFA Cup final, where they again faced Juventus. The Turin team won the trophy, but Fiorentina's tifosi once again had real cause for complaint: the second leg of the final was played in Avellino (Fiorentina's home ground was suspended), a city with many Juventus fans, and emerging star Roberto Baggio was sold to the rival team on the day of the final. Pontello, suffering from economic difficulties, was selling all the players and was forced to leave the club after serious riots in Florence's streets. The club was then acquired by the famous filmmaker Mario Cecchi Gori.

Cecchi Gori era: from Champions League to bankruptcy

The first season under Cecchi Gori's ownership was one of stabilisation, after which the new chairman started to sign some good players like Brian Laudrup, Stefan Effenberg, Francesco Baiano and, most importantly, Gabriel Batistuta, who became an iconic player for the team during the 1990s. In 1993, however, Cecchi Gori died and was succeeded as chairman by his son, Vittorio. Despite a good start to the season, Cecchi Gori fired the coach, Luigi Radice, after a defeat against Atalanta, and replaced him with Aldo Agroppi. The results were dreadful: Fiorentina fell into the bottom half of the standings and were relegated on the last day of the season.

Claudio Ranieri was brought in as coach for the 1993–94 season, and that year, Fiorentina dominated Serie B, Italy's second division. Upon their return to Serie A, Ranieri put together a good team centred around new top scorer Batistuta, signing the young talent Rui Costa from Benfica and the new world champion Brazilian defender Márcio Santos. The former became an idol to Fiorentina fans, while the second disappointed and was sold after only a season. The Viola finished the season in tenth place.

The following season, Cecchi Gori bought other important players, namely Swedish midfielder Stefan Schwarz. The club again proved its mettle in cup competitions, winning the Coppa Italia against Atalanta and finishing joint-third in Serie A. In the summer, Fiorentina became the first non-national champions to win the Supercoppa Italiana, defeating Milan 2–1 at the San Siro.

Fiorentina's 1996–97 season was disappointing in the league, but they did reach the Cup Winners' Cup semi-final by beating Gloria Bistrița, Sparta Prague and Benfica. The team lost the semi-final to the eventual winner of the competition, Barcelona (away 1–1; home 0–2). The season's main signings were Luís Oliveira and Andrei Kanchelskis, the latter of whom suffered from many injuries.

At the end of the season, Ranieri left Fiorentina for Valencia in Spain, with Cecchi Gori appointing Alberto Malesani as his replacement. Fiorentina played well but struggled against smaller teams, although they did manage to qualify for the UEFA Cup. Malesani left Fiorentina after only a season and was succeeded by Giovanni Trapattoni. With Trapattoni's expert guidance and Batistuta's goals, Fiorentina challenged for the title in 1998–99 but finished the season in third, earning them qualification for the Champions League. The following year was disappointing in Serie A, but Viola played some historical matches in the Champions League, beating Arsenal 1–0 at the old Wembley Stadium and Manchester United 2–0 in Florence. They were ultimately eliminated in the second group stage.

At the end of the season, Trapattoni left the club and was replaced by Turkish coach Fatih Terim. More significantly, however, Batistuta was sold to Roma, who eventually won the title the following year. Fiorentina played well in 2000–01 and stayed in the top half of Serie A, despite the resignation of Terim and the arrival of Roberto Mancini. They also won the Coppa Italia for the sixth and last time.

The year 2001 heralded major changes for Fiorentina, as the terrible state of the club's finances was revealed: they were unable to pay wages and had debts of around US$50 million. The club's owner, Vittorio Cecchi Gori, was able to raise some more money, but this soon proved to be insufficient to sustain the club. Fiorentina were relegated at the end of the 2001–02 season and went into judicially-controlled administration in June 2002. This form of bankruptcy (sports companies cannot exactly fail in this way in Italy, but they can suffer a similar procedure) meant that the club was refused a place in Serie B for the 2002–03 season, and as a result effectively ceased to exist.

Della Valle era: from fourth tier to Europe (2000s and 2010s)
The club was promptly re-established in August 2002 as Associazione Calcio Fiorentina e Florentia Viola with shoe and leather entrepreneur Diego Della Valle as new owner and the club was admitted into Serie C2, the fourth tier of Italian football. The only player to remain at the club in its new incarnation was Angelo Di Livio, whose commitment to the club's cause further endeared him to the fans. Helped by Di Livio and 30-goal striker Christian Riganò, the club won its Serie C2 group with considerable ease, which would normally have led to a promotion to Serie C1. Due to the bizarre Caso Catania (Catania Case), the club skipped Serie C1 and was admitted into Serie B, something that was only made possible by the Italian Football Federation (FIGC)'s decision to resolve the Catania situation by increasing the number of teams in Serie B from 20 to 24 and promoting Fiorentina for "sports merits." In the 2003 off-season, the club also bought back the right to use the Fiorentina name and the famous shirt design, and re-incorporated itself as ACF Fiorentina. The club finished the 2003–04 season in sixth place and won the playoff against Perugia to return to top-flight football.

In their first season back in Serie A, the club struggled to avoid relegation, only securing survival on the last day of the season on head-to-head record against Bologna and Parma. In 2005, Della Valle decided to appoint Pantaleo Corvino as new sports director, followed by the appointment of Cesare Prandelli as head coach in the following season. The club made several signings during the summer transfer market, most notably Luca Toni and Sébastien Frey. This drastic move earned them a fourth-place finish with 74 points and a Champions League qualifying round ticket. Toni scored 31 goals in 38 appearances, the first player to pass the 30-goal mark since Antonio Valentin Angelillo in the 1958–59 season, for which he was awarded the European Golden Boot. On 14 July 2006, Fiorentina were relegated to Serie B due to their involvement in the Calciopoli scandal and given a 12-point penalty. The team was reinstated to the Serie A on appeal, but with a 19-point penalty for the 2006–07 season. The team's 2006–07 Champions League place was also revoked. After the start of the season, Fiorentina's penalisation was reduced from 19 points to 15 on appeal to the Italian courts. In spite of this penalty, they managed to secure a place in the UEFA Cup.

Despite Toni's departure to Bayern Munich, Fiorentina had a strong start to the 2007–08 season and were tipped by Italy national team head coach Marcello Lippi, among others, as a surprise challenger for the Scudetto, and although this form tailed off towards the middle of the season, the Viola managed to qualify for the Champions League. In Europe, the club reached the semi-final of the UEFA Cup, where they were ultimately defeated by Rangers on penalties. The 2008–09 season continued this success, a fourth-place finish assuring Fiorentina's spot in 2010's Champions League playoffs. Their European campaign was also similar to that of the previous run, relegated to the 2008–09 UEFA Cup and were eliminated by Ajax in the end.

In the 2009–10 season, Fiorentina started their domestic campaign strongly before steadily losing momentum and slipped to mid-table positions at the latter half of the season. In Europe, the team proved to be a surprise dark horse: after losing their first away fixture against Lyon, they staged a comeback with a five-match streak by winning all their remaining matches (including defeating Liverpool home and away). The Viola qualified as group champions, but eventually succumbed to Bayern Munich due to the away goals rule. This was controversial due to a mistaken refereeing decision by Tom Henning Øvrebø, who allowed a clearly offside goal for Bayern in the first leg. Bayern eventually finished the tournament as runners-up, making a deep run all the way to the final. The incident called into attention the possible implementation of video replays in football. Despite a good European run and reaching the semi-finals in the Coppa Italia, Fiorentina failed to qualify for Europe.

During this period, on 24 September 2009, Andrea Della Valle resigned from his position as chairman of Fiorentina, and announced all duties would be temporarily transferred to Mario Cognini, Fiorentina's vice-president until a permanent position could be filled.

In June 2010, the Viola bid farewell to long-time manager Cesare Prandelli, by then the longest-serving coach in the team's history, who was departing to coach the Italy national team. Catania manager Siniša Mihajlović was appointed to replace him. The club spent much of the early 2010–11 season in last place, but their form improved and Fiorentina ultimately finished ninth. Following a 1–0 defeat to Chievo in November 2011, Mihajlović was sacked and replaced by Delio Rossi. After a brief period of improvements, the Viola were again fighting relegation, prompting the sacking of Sporting Director Pantaleo Corvino in early 2012 following a 0–5 home defeat to Juventus. Their bid for survival was kept alive by a number of upset victories away from home, notably at Roma and Milan. During a home game against Novara, trailing 0–2 within half an hour, manager Rossi decided to substitute midfielder Adem Ljajić early. Ljajić sarcastically applauded him in frustration, whereupon Rossi retaliated by physical assaulting his player, an action that ultimately prompted his termination by the club. His replacement, caretaker manager Vincenzo Guerini, then guided the team away from the relegation zone to a 13th-place finish to end the turbulent year.

To engineer a resurrection of the club after the disappointing season, the Della Valle family invested heavily in the middle of 2012, buying 17 new players and appointing Vincenzo Montella as head coach. The team began the season well, finishing the calendar year in joint third place and eventually finishing the 2012–13 season in fourth, enough for a position in the 2013–14 Europa League.

The club lost fan favourite Stevan Jovetić during the middle of 2013, selling him to English Premier League club Manchester City for a €30 million transfer fee. They also sold Adem Ljajić to Roma and Alessio Cerci to Torino, using the funds to bring in Mario Gómez, Josip Iličić and Ante Rebić, among others. During the season, Fiorentina topped their Europa League group, moving on to the round of 32 to face Danish side Esbjerg fB, which Fiorentina defeated 4–2 on aggregate. In the following round of 16, however, they then lost to Italian rivals Juventus 2–1 on aggregate, ousting Fiorentina from the competition. At the end of the season, the team finished fourth again in the league, and also finishing the year as Coppa Italia runners-up after losing 3–1 to Napoli in the final.

In 2014–15, during the 2015 winter transfer window, the team club sold star winger Juan Cuadrado to Chelsea for €30 million but were able to secure the loan of Mohamed Salah in exchange, who was a revelation in the second half of the season. Their 2014–15 Europa League campaign saw them progress to the semi-finals, where they were knocked-out by Spanish side Sevilla, the eventual champions. In the 2014–15 domestic season, Fiorentina once again finished fourth, thus qualifying for the 2015–16 Europa League. In June 2015, Vincenzo Montella was sacked as manager after the club grew impatient with the coaches inability to prove his commitment to the club, and was replaced by Paulo Sousa, who lasted until June 2017 and the appointment of Stefano Pioli. Club captain Davide Astori died suddenly at the age of 31 in March 2018. Astori had suffered a cardiac arrest while in a hotel room before an away game. The club subsequently retired Astori's kit number, 13. Fiorentina suffered during the 2018–19 Serie A campaign and ended the season on a 14 match winless streak, finishing in 16th place with only 41 points, 3 points from the relegation zone. On 9 April 2019, Pioli resigned as manager and was replaced by Montella.

Commisso era
On 6 June 2019, the club was sold to Italian-American billionaire Rocco Commisso for around 160 million euros. The sale marked the end of the Della Valle family's seventeen-year association with the club. Vincenzo Montella was confirmed as coach for the first season of the new era despite the team's poor end to the previous campaign, which saw them finish only three points clear of the relegation zone. Fiorentina continued their struggles from the previous year, spending the majority of the season in lower midtable. Montella was sacked on 21 December after a 7 match winless run which left the club in 15th place, and was replaced by Giuseppe Iachini.
In November 2020 Cesare Prandelli returned to Fiorentina, replacing Giuseppe Iachini as coach.

Players

Current squad

Other players under contract 
.

Out on loan

Youth Sector

Notable players

Retired numbers

 13  Davide Astori, Defender (2015–18) – posthumous honour

Management staff

Managerial history
Fiorentina have had many managers and head coaches throughout their history. Below is a chronological list from the club's foundation in 1926 to the present day.

Colours and badge

Badge

The official emblem of the city of Florence, a red fleur-de-lis on a white field, has been pivotal in the all-round symbolism of the club.

Over the course of the club's history, they have had several badge changes, all of which incorporated Florence's fleur-de-lis in some way. The first one was nothing more than the city's coat of arms, a white shield with the red fleur-de-lis inside. It was soon changed to a very stylised fleur-de-lis, always red, and sometimes even without the white field. The most common symbol, adopted for about 20 years, had been a white lozenge with the flower inside. During the season they were Italian champions, the lozenge disappeared and the flower was overlapped with the scudetto.

The logo introduced by owner Flavio Pontello in 1980 was particularly distinct, consisting of one-half of the city of Florence's emblem and one-half of the letter "F", for Fiorentina. People disliked it when it was introduced, believing it was a commercial decision and, above all, because the symbol bore more of a resemblance to a halberd than a fleur-de-lis.

Until the 2022–23 season, when the club unveiled a new, stylistically simplified badge, the logo was a kite shaped double lozenge bordered in gold. The outer lozenge had a purple background with the letters "AC" in white and the letter "F" in red, standing for the club's name. The inner lozenge was white with a gold border and the red Giglio of Florence. This logo had been in use from 1992 to 2002, but after the financial crisis and resurrection of the club the new one couldn't use the same logo. Florence's comune instead granted Florentia Viola use of the stylised coat of arms used in other city documents. Diego Della Valle acquired the current logo the following year in a judicial auction for a fee of €2.5 million, making it the most expensive logo in Italian football.

Kit and colours

When Fiorentina was founded in 1926, the players wore red and white halved shirts derived from the colour of the city emblem. The more well-known and highly distinctive purple kit was adopted in 1928 and has been used ever since, giving rise to the nickname La Viola ("The Purple (team)"). Tradition has it that Fiorentina got their purple kit by mistake after an accident washing the old red and white coloured kits in the river.

The away kit has always been predominantly white, sometimes with purple and red elements, sometimes all-white. The shorts had been purple when the home kit was with white shorts. Fiorentina's third kit was first worn in the 1995–96 season and it was all-red with purple borders and two lilies on the shoulders. The red shirt has been the most worn 3rd shirt by Fiorentina, although they also wore rare yellow shirts ('97–'98, '99–'00 and '10–'11) and a sterling version, mostly in the Coppa Italia, in 2000–01.

For the 2017–18 season and the first time in its history, the club used five kits during the season, composing of one home kit (all-purple) and four away kits, each one representing one historic quartiere of the city of Florence: all-blue (Santa Croce), all-white (Santo Spirito), all-green (San Giovanni) and all-red (Santa Maria Novella).

Anthem
"Canzone Viola" (Purple Song) is the title of the Fiorentina'a song, nowadays better known as "Oh Fiorentina". It is the oldest official football anthem in Italy and one of the oldest in the world. Dated 1930 and born only four years after the creation of the club, the song was written by a 12-year-old child, Enzo Marcacci, and musically arranged by maestro Marco Vinicio. It was published for the first time by the publisher Marcello Manni, who later became the owner of the rights. It soon achieved notoriety thanks to the printed media and the Ordine del Marzocco, a sort of original viola-club, which printed the lyrics of the song and distributed it to a home match on November 22, 1931.
The song was recorded by Narciso Parigi in 1959 and again in 1965; the latter version replaced the original edition as the Fiorentina anthem. Subsequently, Narciso Parigi himself acquired the ownership of the rights, which he donated in 2002 to the supporter club Collettivo Autonomo Viola.

Kit suppliers and shirt sponsors

Kit manufacturer
 1978–1981: Adidas
 1981–1983: J.D.Farrow's
 1983–1988: Ennerre
 1988–1991: Abbigliamento Sportivo
 1991–1993: Lotto
 1993–1995: Uhlsport
 1995–1997: Reebok
 1997–2000: Fila
 2000–2001: Diadora
 2001–2002: Mizuno
 2002–2003: Mizuno, Garman, Puma
 2003–2005: Adidas
 2005–2012: Lotto
 2012–2015: Joma
 2015–2020: Le Coq Sportif
 2020–: Kappa

Shirt sponsors
 1981–1983: J.D.Farrow's
 1983–1986: Opel
 1986–1989: Crodino
 1989–1991: La Nazione
 1991–1992: Giocheria
 1992–1994: 7up
 1994–1997: Sammontana
 1997–1999: Nintendo
 1999–2002: Toyota
 2002–2004: Fondiaria-Sai
 2004–2010: Toyota
 2010–2011: Save The Children
 2011–2014: Mazda
 2014–2016: Volkswagen, Save The Children
 2016–2019: Vorwerk Folletto, Save The Children, Dream Loud
 2019–present: Mediacom

Official Partners 

 EA Sports - Football Video Gaming Partner
 Montezemolo - Fashion Partner
 Gruppoaf - Official Partner
 Sammontana - Official Ice Cream
 Synlab - Health Partner
 OlyBet.tv - Infotainment partner

Honours

National titles 
Serie A
Winners (2) : 1955–56, 1968–69

Coppa Italia
Winners (6): 1939–40, 1960–61, 1965–66, 1974–75, 1995–96, 2000–01

Supercoppa Italiana
Winners (1): 1996

International titles 

European Cup Winners' Cup
Winners: 1960–61

Other titles 
Serie B
Winners (3): 1930–31, 1938–39, 1993–94

Anglo-Italian League Cup
Winners: 1975

Mitropa Cup
Winners: 1966

Coppa Grasshoppers
Winners: 1957

Serie C2
Winners: 2002–03

Divisional movements

Fiorentina as a company
A.C. Fiorentina S.p.A. was unable to register for 2002–03 Serie B due to financial difficulties, and then the sports title was transferred to a new company thanks to Article 52 of N.O.I.F., while the old company was liquidated. At that time the club was heavily relying on windfall profit from selling players, especially in pure player swap or cash plus player swap that potentially increased the cost by the increase in amortisation of player contracts (an intangible assets). For example, Marco Rossi joined Fiorentina for Lire 17 billion in 2000, but at the same time Lorenzo Collacchioni moved to Salernitana for Lire 1 billion, meaning the club had a player profit of Lire 997 million and extra Lire 1 billion to be amortised in 5-years. In 1999, Emiliano Bigica also swapped with Giuseppe Taglialatela, which the latter was valued for Lire 10 billion. The operating income (excluding windfall profit from players trading) of 2000–01 season was minus Lire 113,271,475,933  (minus €58,499,835). It was only boosted by the sales of Francesco Toldo and Rui Costa in June 2001 (a profit of Lire 134.883 billion; €69.661 million). However, it was alleged they were to transfer to Parma for a reported Lire 140 million. The two players eventually joined Inter Milan and A.C. Milan in 2001–02 financial year instead, for undisclosed fees. Failing to have financial support from the owner Vittorio Cecchi Gori, the club was forced to windup due to its huge imbalance in operating income.

Since re-established in 2002, ACF Fiorentina S.p.A. are yet to self-sustain to keep the team in top division as well as in European competitions. In the 2005 financial year, which cover the first Serie A season, the club made a net loss of €9,159,356, followed by a net loss of €19,519,789. In 2006 (2005–06 Serie A and 2006–07 Serie A), Fiorentina heavily invested on players, meaning the amortisation of intangible asset (the player contract) had increased from €17.7 million to €24 million. However the club suffered from the 2006 Italian football scandal, which meant the club did not qualify for Europe. In 2007 Fiorentina almost broke-even, with a net loss of just €3,704,953. In the 2007 financial year the TV revenue increased after they qualified to the 2007–08 UEFA Cup. Despite qualifying to the 2008–09 UEFA Champions League, Fiorentina made a net loss of €9,179,484 in 2008 financial year after the increase in TV revenue was outweighed by the increase in wage. In the 2009 financial year, Fiorentina made a net profit of €4,442,803, largely due to the profit on selling players (€33,631,489 from players such as Felipe Melo, Giampaolo Pazzini and Zdravko Kuzmanović; increased from about €3.5 million in 2008). However it was also offset by the write-down of selling players (€6,062,545, from players such as Manuel da Costa, Arturo Lupoli and Davide Carcuro).

After the club failed to qualify to Europe at the end of 2009–10 Serie A, as well as lack of player profit, Fiorentina turnover was decreased from €140,040,713 in 2009 to just €79,854,928, despite the wage bill also falling, la Viola still made a net loss of €9,604,353. In the 2011 financial year, the turnover slipped to €67,076,953, as the club's lack of capital gains from selling players and 2010 financial year still included the instalments from UEFA for participating 2009–10 UEFA Europa League. Furthermore, the gate income had dropped from €11,070,385 to €7,541,260. The wage bill did not fall much and in reverse the amortisation of transfer fee had sightly increased due to new signings. La Viola had savings in other costs but counter-weighted by huge €11,747,668 write-down for departed players, due to D'Agostino, Frey and Mutu, but the former would counter-weight by co-ownership financial income, which all made the operating cost remained high as worse as last year. Moreover, in 2010 the result was boosted by acquiring the asset from subsidiary (related to AC Fiorentina) and the re-valuation of its value in separate balance sheet. If deducting that income (€14,737,855), 2010 financial year was net loss 24,342,208 and 2011 result was worse with €8,131,876 only in separate balance sheet. In 2012, the club benefited from the sales of Matija Nastasić and Valon Behrami, followed by Stevan Jovetić and Adem Ljajić in 2013. In 2014, due to €28.4 million drop from the windfall profit of selling players, the club recorded their worst financial results since re-foundation, despite the fact the club maintained the same level of windfall profit, the result was still worse than in 2013. Moreover, Fiorentina also revealed that the club had a relevant football net income of minus €19.5 million in the first assessment period of UEFA Financial Fair Play Regulations in the 2013–14 season (in May 2014). (aggregate of 2012 and 2013 results), which within the limit of minus €45 million, as well as minus €25.5 million in assessment period 2014–15 (aggregate of 2012, 2013 and 2014 results). However, as the limit was reduced to minus €30 million in assessment period 2015–16, 2016–17 and 2017–18 season, the club had to achieve a relevant net income of positive €5.6 million in 2015 financial year. La Viola sold Juan Cuadrado to Chelsea in January 2015 for €30 million fee, to make the club eligible to 2016–17 edition of UEFA competitions.

League history
1926–1928 Prima Divisione (2nd tier)
1928–1929 Divisione Nazionale (1st tier)
1929–1931 Serie B (2nd tier) – Champions: 1931
1931–1938 Serie A (1st tier)
1938–1939 Serie B (2nd tier) – Champions: 1939
1939–1943 Serie A (1st tier)
1943–1946 no contests (WW II)
1946–1993 liga 1 (1st tier) – Champions: 1956, 1969
1993–1994 Serie B (2nd tier) – Champions: 1994
1994–2002 Serie A (1st tier)
2002–2003 Serie C2 (4th tier) – Champions: 2003
2003–2004 Serie B (2nd tier)
2004–present Serie A (1st tier)

References

External links

  (Italian and English)
 Team page at Goal.com
 Team page at ESPN Soccernet
 Team Page at Football-Lineups.com
 Artemio Franchi Stadium at Stadium Journey
 Fiorentina Supporters I poeti della curva

 
Football clubs in Italy
Football clubs in Tuscany
Association football clubs established in 1926
Serie A clubs
Serie B clubs
Serie C clubs
UEFA Cup Winners' Cup winning clubs
Serie A winning clubs
Coppa Italia winning clubs
1926 establishments in Italy
Della Valle family
Phoenix clubs (association football)
2002 establishments in Italy